Joseph Sheard (11 October 1813 – 30 August 1883) was an English architect and politician. He was Mayor of Toronto from 1871 to 1872.

Born in Hornsea, near Hull, Yorkshire, England, his father died when he was only six weeks old, leaving four young children to be raised by his mother. He quit school at the age of 9 and found a job as an apprentice with a barrel-maker.

Aged 19, he sailed from Hull on 15 April 1833 aboard the "Foster" landing in Quebec. He made his way by Durham boat to Prescott, Upper Canada where he boarded the steamboat "William the Fourth" for York, arriving in Toronto in 1833.

He first was a carpenter, builder, and then became an architect in the 1840s.   He built the William Cawthra house (a mansion at the corner of King & Bay, Toronto) which was demolished in 1946.  He also built the Ontario Bank building (at the corner of Scott & Wellington). He was also a member of the Orange Order in Canada.

At the time of Confederation, he was the Commissioner of Works and an alderman (1851–1871) in St. Patrick's Ward. He introduced the motion for the August Civic Holiday. In 1851, he is listed as an alderman, a building inspector, and an architect civil engineer. He designed the Dead house in St. Michael's Cemetery, and he had an entry for the design the original Parliament Buildings of Canada in Ottawa in 1859.

When he was Foreman of Public Works, he refused to build the gallows to hang two leaders of the Upper Canada Rebellion, Samuel Lount and Peter Matthews. When he refused he said, 'I'll not put a hand to it,' said he; 'Lount and Matthews have done nothing that I might not have done myself, and I'll never help build a gallows to hang them."

A park was named in his honour on the lot that was once his home (The Mayor Joseph Sheard Parkette). It is found between the streets Yonge, McGill, Anne (now called Granby) and Church (12 McGill St).

His son, Dr. Charles Sheard, became the city's Chief Medical Officer and also served as a Member of Parliament. Other and current living members of the Sheard family include:

 Dr Charles Sheard Jr (1886–1947) – son of Charles Sheard
 Justice Joseph David Sheard (1924–2015) – son of Joseph Louis Sheard (1891–1956), grandson of Joseph Sheard and former Ontario Court of Justice General Division
 Terence Sheard QC (1898–1985) – lawyer and author of Canadian Forms of Wills [1950]
 Matthew Sheard (1840–1910) – architect and son of Joseph Sheard

Works

References

External 
Historic Places in Canada

1813 births
1883 deaths
Canadian architects
English emigrants to pre-Confederation Ontario
Mayors of Toronto
Immigrants to Upper Canada